Ro-58 may refer to:

 IMAM Ro.58, an Italian fighter and attack aircraft of 1942
 , an Imperial Japanese Navy submarine in commission from 1922 to 1945